Gabriele Köllmann is a former West German slalom canoeist who competed from the late 1970s to the early 1980s.

She won two medals in the K-1 team event at the ICF Canoe Slalom World Championships with a gold in 1981 and a silver in 1979.

References
Overview of athlete's results at canoeslalom.net

West German female canoeists
Possibly living people
Year of birth missing (living people)
Medalists at the ICF Canoe Slalom World Championships